The  was a limited express train operated by East Japan Railway Company (JR East) between ,  and  via . First introduced in 1975, the last service ran on 13 March 2015.

History
The Ayame service was first introduced on 10 March 1975, initially as four return workings daily between Tokyo and Kashima-Jingu.

The late 1980s saw increased competition from long-distance bus services between Tokyo and Kashima, and from the July 1993 timetable revision, the number of Ayame services was reduced to three return workings daily. In December 1994, services were further cut back, with just one up service in the morning and one down service in the evening. From the October 2004 timetable revision, the complementary Suigō limited express ( to  via Narita Line) and Hometown Narita services were discontinued and the number of Ayame services was correspondingly increased to four up and two down services daily. From the start of the revised timetable on 10 December 2005, Ayame services were made entirely no-smoking. 

By March 2014, there were two return Ayame workings daily: one return working between Tokyo and Kashima-Jingu, and one between Tokyo and Chōshi. The services operated as all-stations "Local" services between Sawara and Kashima-Jingu or Chōshi.

From the start of the 14 March 2015 timetable revision, the remaining Ayame services were discontinued due to low ridership amid competition by bus services, despite the fact that its scheduled travel time between Tokyo and Kashima-Jingu was only one hour and 43 minutes, about 40 minutes faster than bus schedules.

Rolling stock

 183 series 6-car EMUs
 E257-500 series 5-car EMUs (December 2005 - March 2015)

Formations
Trains were formed as shown below, with car 1 at the Tokyo end. All cars were ordinary class and non-reserved.

See also
 List of named passenger trains of Japan

References

External links

East Japan Railway Company
Named passenger trains of Japan
Railway services introduced in 1975
Railway services discontinued in 2015